Saint-Julien-le-Châtel is a commune in the Creuse department in central France.

Geography
The river Tardes forms part of the commune's eastern border.
The Voueize flows north through the western part of the commune.

Population

See also
Communes of the Creuse department

References

Communes of Creuse